Lakeview Middle School may refer to:

 Lakeview Middle School (Greenville, South Carolina). See Greenville County School District.
Lakeview Middle School (Kansas City, Missouri). See Park Hill School District.
 Lakeview Middle School (Watsonville, California). See Pajaro Valley Unified School District.
 Lakeview Middle School (Winter Garden, Florida)